The China national table tennis team is the national representative team of the People's Republic of China, and was founded in 1952.

Players

Men's team

Women's team

^: Not the regular player.

Staffs

Team manager and Head coaches

Men's first team

Women's first team

Men's second team

Women's second team

Fitness coaches

Historical staffs

Team Managers

Head coaches

Men's team head coaches

Women's team head coaches

Qualifying competitions
 Road to Düsseldorf 2017

Records of the youngest

Men's in Major Three

Women's in Major Three

Notes: Major Three (三大赛) is the abbreviation of the most important three table tennis competitions including World Championships, Olympics and World Cups.

Singles champions in World Tours

Notable players

Grand Slams
A Grand Slam is earned by a player who wins singles crowns at Olympic Games, World Championships, and World Cup.

Junior Grand Slams
A Junior Grand Slam is earned by a player who wins singles crowns at Summer Youth Olympics and World Youth Championships.

Hall of Fame
This page lists the players of China table tennis team inducted in the ITTF Hall of Fame – founded in 1993 – in the order as they appear in the official hall of fame maintained by the International Table Tennis Federation. The ITTF Hall of Fame includes both table tennis players and officers.

Record of world champions

Advisory Group

Medal count

References

See also
List of China table tennis squads at the Olympics

Table tennis in China
Table